The real-time web is a network web using technologies and practices that enable users to receive information as soon as it is published by its authors, rather than requiring that they or their software check a source periodically for updates.

Difference from real-time computing
The real-time web is different from real-time computing in that there is no knowing when, or if, a response will be received. The information types transmitted this way are often short messages, status updates, news alerts, or links to longer documents. The content is often "soft" in that it is based on the social web—people's opinions, attitudes, thoughts, and interests—as opposed to hard news or facts.

History
Examples of real-time web are Facebook's newsfeed, and Twitter, implemented in social networking, search, and news sites. Benefits are said to include increased user engagement ("flow") and decreased server loads. In December 2009 real-time search facilities were added to Google Search.

The absolutely first realtime web implementation worldwide have been the WIMS true-realtime server and its web apps in 2001-2011 (WIMS = Web Interactive Management System); based on the True-RealTime Web (WEB-r) model of above; built in WIMS++ (server built in Java) (serverside) and Adobe Flash (ex Macromedia Flash) (clientside). The true-realtime web model was born in 2000 at mc2labs.net by an Italian independent researcher.

Real-time search
A problem created by the rapid pace and huge volume of information created by real-time web technologies and practices is finding relevant information. One approach, known as real-time search, is the concept of searching for and finding information online as it is produced. Advancements in web search technology coupled with growing use of social media enable online activities to be queried as they occur. A traditional web search crawls and indexes web pages periodically, returning results based on relevance to the search query. Google Real-Time Search was available in Google Search until July 2011.

See also
Comet
Collaborative real-time editor
Firebase
Internet of Things (IoT)
Meteor
Microblogging
Mojolicious
Node.js
Prospective search
PubNub
Push Technology
Vert.x

References

External links

 

 
Internet search